Slobodan Pavlović (born 1 July 1960) is a Yugoslav boxer. He competed in the men's lightweight event at the 1984 Summer Olympics.

References

1960 births
Living people
Yugoslav male boxers
Olympic boxers of Yugoslavia
Boxers at the 1984 Summer Olympics
Place of birth missing (living people)
Lightweight boxers